Lake of Stars Festival is an annual three-day international festival held on the shores of Lake Malawi, the third largest lake in Africa. The first festival took place in 2004 and attracts over 4,000 attendees with musical acts drawn mainly from Africa and Europe.

History

The festival was founded by British tourist Will Jameson. Jameson visited Malawi in 1998. He was a student at John Moores University and took a year off to work with The Wildlife Society. That work sent him to Malawi. Upon returning to college, Jameson started night club as tribute to his trip, called Chibuku Shake Shake, the name of a brand of Malawian beer. The club night was named the best club night in the United Kingdom 2004 by Mixmag. That same year, Jameson held the first festival. An estimated 700 people attended, the majority from Africa. The 2011 Lake of Stars attracted over 3,000 attendees from Europe and Africa. The festival was opened with the Malawian ministry of tourism skydiving onto the festival beach.

Media and accolades

Lake of Stars Festival is widely referenced as being one of the most important festivals on the African continent. In 2014, it was named one of the top seven African music festivals to attend by CNN. Time Out named Lake of Stars as having the most beautiful festival location in the world, in 2015. The UK's Independent newspaper has said "the life-affirming Lake of Stars offers a fascinating opportunity to experience the musical pulse of this inspiring country". In 2016, Vice Magazine recognised that "the ability of this festival to inspire the young people who attend is pretty special"

Festival management

The Lake of Stars Festival is organised by a mixture of international volunteers, many of them with huge amounts of experience in the live events industry, supporting a team in Malawi.  The festival receives pro-bono support from the UK music industry, with the UK headliners that travel to Malawi usually agreeing to waive their normal performance fees. An estimated over $1 million is generated by the festival for the local economy each year.

Activities

The festival organizes volunteer opportunities for festival attendees, providing service to a variety of charities sponsored by the festival including the Microloan Foundation. Attendees also visit orphanages to spend time with children and play games and sports with them. The festival also includes talks, similar to TED talks, 
theatre, dance and mixed martial arts.

Performers

A wide swath of international performers play at Lake of Stars, many from Africa and the United Kingdom. These artists include, but are not limited to:

Afrikan Boy
Foals
Freshlyground
Get Cape. Wear Cape. Fly (2011)
Tay Grin
John Wizards (2014)
Mafikizolo (2014)
MistaJam (2011)
Oliver "Tuku" Mtukudzi (2011)
Noisettes (2011) 
Sauti Sol
The Maccabees
The Very Best (2014)
Young Fathers (2015)
Zone Fam (2014)

Locations/Venues

Other Events
The Lake of Stars project organises other events in Malawi in addition to the main festival, including the Children's Future Festival  and film festival Lilongwe Shorts.

Outside of Malawi the project is organising new festivals in 2018, taking place in London and Glasgow and featuring artists from Malawi, Zambia, Ghana, South Africa and the UK

References

External links

Music festivals in Malawi
September events
October events